Věra Bílá (22 May 1954 – 12 March 2019) was a Czech vocalist and musician of Romani ethnicity, who initially gained acclaim performing Romani folk and pop songs. She was the lead singer of the Czech recording act Kale, with whom she performed songs in Romani, Czech, and Slovak. She was highly acclaimed, toured internationally and was often called the "Ella Fitzgerald of Gypsy music" or the "Queen of Romany"

Biography
Bílá, a Rokycany native, was the daughter of singer Karol Giňa. She lived and worked in the Czech Republic. Her name Věra means "faith" in Slavic languages; and her surname "Bílá" means "white" in Czech. In 1999 director Mira Erdevicki-Charap portrayed Bila in the documentary "Black and White in Colour".

Bila died on 12 March 2019, aged 64 of a heart attack.

Recordings
Věra Bílá & Kale – C'est comme ca
Věra Bílá – Queen Of Romany
Věra Bílá & Kale – Rovava
Věra Bílá & Kale – Kale Kalore
Věra Bílá & Kale – Rom-Pop (produced by Zuzana Navarová)

References

External links
 Věra Bílá – singer — an article on Roma in the Czech Republic website
 [ Věra Bílá] — on Allmusic

1954 births
2019 deaths
People from Rokycany
20th-century Czech women singers
Czech Romani people
Czechoslovak Romani people
Romani musicians
Czech people of Romani descent

Romani-language singers
Czechoslovak women singers